Microcalicium is a genus  of lichen-forming fungi in the order Pertusariales. It is the only genus in the monotypic family Microcaliciaceae. These taxa were circumscribed by the Finnish lichenologist Edvard August Vainio in 1927, with Microcalicium disseminatum assigned as the type species.

Description
Species of Microcalicium have a mazaediate ascomata (an irregularly spherical fruiting body in which ascus walls break down to leave a dry, loose, amorphous, powdery, often dark, mass of spores together with disintegrating asci and paraphyses). Their asci are ellipsoid in shape and non-amyloid.

Species
, Species Fungorum accepts the following four species in the genus Microcalicium:
Microcalicium ahlneri 
Microcalicium arenarium 
Microcalicium conversum 
Microcalicium disseminatum

References

Pertusariales
Lichen genera
Taxa named by Edvard August Vainio
Taxa described in 1927

Pertusariales genera